Peter Hartz (born 9 August 1941 in Sankt Ingbert), was the human resources executive at the German public company Volkswagen AG (VW). Twenty percent of Volkswagen's shares are owned by the state of Lower Saxony. Hartz became notable as adviser to German chancellor and former Prime Minister of Lower Saxony, Gerhard Schröder, with whom Hartz developed the so-called Hartz-reforms of the German labour market and job agencies; the German welfare benefit, Hartz IV, is named after the fourth stage of his reforms.

Resignation
On 8 July 2005, Hartz offered his resignation (which was accepted a few days later) amidst allegations of wrongdoings in his area of responsibility at Volkswagen, which include :
 kickbacks to Volkswagen managers from bogus companies doing real estate business with Volkswagen, especially at the Czech subsidiary Škoda Auto;
 favours to members of the works council (Betriebsrat), which are illegal under German law (the chairman of the VW works council, had resigned 30 June 2005).
 The contracting of prostitutes at the company's expense, sometimes in company-owned apartments and under the influence of Viagra, which had been prescribed by the company's medical service.

Conviction

References

See also
:de:VW-Korruptionsaffäre, article about the Volkswagen scandal in the German Wikipedia
Sustainable development

1941 births
Living people
People from Sankt Ingbert
Officers Crosses of the Order of Merit of the Federal Republic of Germany
Recipients of the Federal Order of Merit who returned their decoration